The Pinnacle is a  shopping center and commercial development located in Bristol, Tennessee.  Established by Johnson Commercial Development and Oldacre McDonald LLC, its first stores opened in 2014.  It is a mixed-use complex, with 1.3 million square feet (appx. 121,000 square meters) of retail, restaurant, hotel, and office space, as well as recreational areas.

Anchor stores are Bass Pro Shops, Belk, Dick's Sporting Goods, CarMax and Marquee Cinemas. Its junior anchors are Old Navy, Michael's, ULTA, Kirkland's, and Marshall's.

History
The $200,000,000 development was partially funded by the City of Bristol, which provided $25,000,000 for the Public Infrastructure portion of the project.  Johnson estimates that the first phase of the complex will create 2000 jobs, and add $200 million in annual sales to the local economy. The first stores opened in 2014 and many have followed in 2015. Pinnacle 12 by Marquee Cinemas opened in October 2015.

Recreation
Pinnacle Park is located near Bass Pro Shops.  It is a  park with a lake and lakeside trail.

References

External links
 www.thepinnacle.com
 visitbristoltnva.org
 
 

Shopping malls in Tennessee
Bristol, Tennessee
Tourist attractions in Bristol, Tennessee
Tourist attractions in Sullivan County, Tennessee
Shopping malls established in 2014
2014 establishments in Tennessee